Cub-1 was a code name for a medium-sized military division of an Advance Base Aviation Training Unit.

The United States Navy established the ABATU at the onset of World War II to support expeditionary airfield operations in the Pacific Area of Operations. Guadalcanal was the first operation that used an ABATU.  Large sized units were code-named Lion and medium-sized units were code-named Cub.

See also
US Naval Base Solomon Islands
US Naval Advance Bases
Seabee

References

Code names
United States naval aviation